Frederick Beedall (15 August 1911 – 1976) was an English professional footballer. He was born in Chesterfield.

1911 births
1976 deaths
Footballers from Chesterfield
English footballers
Chesterfield F.C. players
Torquay United F.C. players
Association football forwards